Ove Juul (23 October 1615 – 29 May 1686) was a Danish nobleman who served as Vice Governor-general of Norway under Ulrik Fredrik Gyldenløve from 1669 to 1674.

Family and youth
Ove's father was Iver Juul at Villestrup, Thaarupgaard and Lundbæk (1563–1627). Iver had two sons who rose to positions of importance in Denmark-Norway: Ove Juul (1615–1689) of Lundbæk-Pandum, Villestrup, Kragerup and Bregentved, and Tønne Juul (1620–1684) of Thaarupgaard. Ove’s paternal grandfather was Axel Juul, (1503–1577) an Army officer in charge of Aalborghus Castle, who originally built Villestrup.

Ove attended Sorø Academy in Sorø, Danmark. He traveled first to Wittenberg where he studied at the University of Wittenberg. He then continued to England, the Netherlands, France and Italy.  The diary which was maintained provides an interesting insight on the art and mores of the period.

Career
In 1661, he became the Diocesan Governor in Ålborg. Subsequently Juul served as Vice Governor-general in Norway under Ulrik Fredrik Gyldenløve from 1669 to 1674. From 1671 until 1679, he was the Diocesan Governor of Stavanger stiftamt as well as the County Governor of Nedenæs amt. From 1676 through 1679, he was the Vice Chancellor of Danish Chancellery in Copenhagen. During the period of Danish absolutism, the Chancellery, along with the Treasury, the Commercial College served to provide a coordinated central administration in Denmark which provided, among other things, direction to the Governor-general in Norway. This administration reported via the Privy Council (Konseil-Geheimråd) to the King, who held absolute power.

From 1681, he served as assessor (Høiesteretsassessor—an assessor was a councilor of the realm who served in one of the two positions reserved for nobility) of Århus.

References

1615 births
1686 deaths
17th-century Norwegian civil servants
Governors-general of Norway
Juel family
17th-century Danish nobility
17th-century Norwegian nobility